Merve Tuncel (born 1 January 2005) is a Turkish swimmer specialized in the freestyle swimming. She qualified for the 800m and 1500m freestyle events of the 2020 Summer Olympics. She is a member of Enka SK.

Early years
Merve Tuncel was born to Sulhi and Adalet Tuncel in Ankara, Turkey on 1 January 2005. She is a student at Nermin Mehmet Çekiç Anatolian High School in Yenimahalle, Ankara.

She liked to play with water in her very early youth years. She started swimming at Age 4 At age ten, she started to swim at the Turkey Olympic Preparation Center in Eryaman, Ankara under the Head Coach Gjon Shyti. From 2019 she swims for Enka SK, but her coach is still Gjon Shyti and she continues training in Ankara.

Swimming career
Tuncel won the silver medal in the 200m butterfly, and the bronze medal in the 800m freestyle at the 2019 European Youth Summer Olympic Festival in Baku, Azerbaijan. She broke the juniors world record at Istanbul, Turkey on 22 December 2020 in the short course 1500m freestyle swimming event with 15:45.29. She won gold medals in the events 400 m, 800 m, 1500 m, and the bronze medal in the  freestyle relay event of the 2021 European Junior Swimming Championships in Rome, Italy. She set new championships record and European Juniors record with her times 8:21.91 in 800 m freestyle, and 15:55.23 in 1500 m freestyle.

Tuncel was the flag bearer for Turkey together with Berke Saka at the 2020 Summer Olympics opening ceremony.

References

2005 births
Living people
Sportspeople from Ankara
Turkish female freestyle swimmers
Turkish female long-distance swimmers
Enkaspor swimmers
Swimmers at the 2020 Summer Olympics
Swimmers at the 2022 Mediterranean Games
Mediterranean Games gold medalists for Turkey
Mediterranean Games bronze medalists for Turkey
Mediterranean Games medalists in swimming
Islamic Solidarity Games competitors for Turkey
Islamic Solidarity Games medalists in swimming
European Aquatics Championships medalists in swimming
21st-century Turkish sportswomen